A guildhall, also known as a "guild hall" or "guild house", is a historical building originally used for tax collecting by municipalities or merchants in Great Britain and the Low Countries. These buildings commonly become town halls and in some cases museums while retaining their original names.

Guildhalls as town hall in the United Kingdom
In the United Kingdom, a guildhall is usually a town hall: in the vast majority of cases, the guildhalls have never served as the meeting place of any specific guild. A suggested etymology is from the Anglo Saxon "gild, or "payment"; the guildhall being where citizens came to pay their rates. The London Guildhall was established around 1120. For the Scottish municipal equivalent see tolbooth.

List of guildhalls in the United Kingdom

Andover Guildhall
Barnstaple Guildhall
Bath Guildhall
Beverley Guildhall
Bewdley Guildhall
Blakeney Guildhall
Boston Guildhall
Brecon Guildhall
Bristol Guildhall
Bury St Edmunds Guildhall
Cambridge Guildhall
Canterbury Guildhall
Cardigan Guildhall
Carmarthen Guildhall
Chard Guildhall
Chester Guildhall
Chichester Guildhall
Conwy Guildhall
Derby Guildhall
Devonport Guildhall
Derry Guildhall
Exeter Guildhall
Faversham Guildhall
Gloucester Guildhall 
Grantham Guildhall
Guildford Guildhall
Helston Guildhall
High Wycombe Guildhall
Hull Guildhall
King's Lynn Guildhall
Kingston upon Thames Guildhall
Lavenham Guildhall
Leicester Guildhall
Lichfield Guildhall
Lincoln Guildhall
Liskeard Guildhall
London Guildhall
Middlesex Guildhall
Much Wenlock Guildhall
Newcastle-under-Lyme Guildhall
Newcastle upon Tyne Guildhall
Merchant Adventurers' Hall, York
Newport Guildhall, Isle of Wight
Newport Guildhall, Shropshire
Northampton Guildhall
Norwich Guildhall
Oswestry Guildhall
Peterborough Guildhall
Plymouth Guildhall
Poole Guildhall
Portsmouth Guildhall
Preston Guildhall
Rochester Guildhall
Salisbury Guildhall
Saltash Guildhall
Southampton Guildhall
South Molton Guildhall
St Ives Guildhall
St Mary's Guildhall, Coventry
Stratford-upon-Avon Guildhall
Swansea Guildhall
Thaxted Guildhall
Thetford Guildhall
Totnes Guildhall
Weymouth Guildhall
Winchester Guildhall
Windsor Guildhall
Worcester Guildhall
York Guildhall

Guild halls as meeting houses for guilds

A type of guild was known in Roman times. Known as collegium, collegia or corpus, these were organised groups of merchants who specialised in a particular craft and whose membership of the group was voluntary. One such example is the corpus naviculariorum, the college of long-distance shippers based at Rome's port, Ostia Antica. The Roman guilds failed to survive the collapse of the Roman Empire. 

Merchant guilds were reinvented during Europe's Medieval period. In England, these guilds went by many different names including: fraternity, brotherhood, college, company, corporation, fellowship, livery, or  society, amongst other terms. In Europe, merchant guilds were known as  natie, consulado or hansa. A fraternity, formed by the merchants of Tiel in Gelderland (present-day Netherlands), in 1020 is believed to be the first example of a Medieval guild. The first instance of usage of the term, "guild", was the gilda mercatoria used to describe a body of merchants operating out of St. Omer, France in the 11th century and London's Hanse was formed in the 12th century. The merchants of Cologne had their house in London as early as 1157 and the Guilda Teutonicorum (German merchants warehouse) was located at Cosin Lane and Thames Street in London on the 12th century. 

These guilds controlled the way that trade was conducted in their region and codified rules governing the conditions of trade. Once established, merchant guild rules were often incorporated into the charters granted to market towns. By the 13th and 14th centuries, merchant guilds had acquired sufficient resources to erect guild halls in many major market towns.

Medieval guild halls were used to store goods and as places for celebratory events. When not required for guild members' events, the hall often became place where townspeople could hold entertainments such as Passion plays. Guild members often cleaned streets, removed rubbish, maintained a nightwatch and provided food relief to the poor. Some medieval guilds allowed market trading to occur on the ground floor of the guildhall.

In the City of London, the guilds are called "livery companies", and their guild halls are called livery halls.

Guildhalls in the Low Countries 
The Low Countries used to have guildhalls in every city, often one gildenhuis (Dutch, literally "guild house") for each trade. They were often elaborate, ornate buildings, demonstrating the guild's status. Occasionally a single hall would be used by all the city's guilds. 

The guildhall was used as the offices of the  deken (deacon) and other guild officers, and for meetings by the overlieden (board of directors). The guild members would occasionally be called to the guildhall for meetings on important matters.

In Amsterdam, every guildhall had its gildeknecht (guild servant), often the guild's youngest member, and was guarded by a gildehond (guild dog). Every evening, the guild brothers gathered in the tavern room of the guildhall to discuss the events of the day while the gildeknecht served beer. Once a year, the guildmen would gather in the guildhall for a communal meal.

The guildhall of the merchants' guild also served as de facto commodity market. Therefore, there was no need in the Middle Ages for a separate building for this purpose.

In the Low Countries, each guildhall was marked by the coat of arms of that guild, hanging from the facade of the building. Occasionally, the coat of arms was replaced with a gable stone depicting a member of the guild, surrounded by the tools of his trade.

In Belgium
 The Round Table (or Tafelrond, in Dutch) in Leuven. Designed 1479 by Matheus de Layens, guildhall built 1480–1487 internally comprising three houses, demolished 1817, reconstructed following original plans 1921. The old building's meeting rooms had been let to the guilds; the new had been in use by a bank and became a personal private property.
 House The Salmon (or De Zalm, in Dutch) in Mechelen. Built c. 1530 in early Renaissance style by architect Willem van Wechtere for the prosperous fishermen's guild, it is one of the city's finest historical houses. The artist  (1839–1919) used to live there. In the mid-20th century it became city property and held a museum, then the Tourist Information Office, and later again a museum.
 In Brussels, the Grand-Place is famous for its many Baroque guildhalls, each one belonging to one of the former Guilds of Brussels.

See also
 Company of Merchant Adventurers of London 
 Company of Merchant Adventurers to New Lands
 Germania (guild)
 Guild

References

External links 
 
 
 

 
Seats of local government